Reverence may refer to:

 Reverence (emotion) a subjective response to something excellent in a personal way
 Reverence (attitude), the acknowledgement of the legitimacy of the power of one's superior or superiors

Music
 Reverence (Faithless album), a 1996 trip-hop album by Faithless
 Reverence (Emperor album), a 1997 symphonic black metal album by Emperor
 Reverence (Richard Bona album), a 2001 jazz album by Richard Bona
 Reverence (Parkway Drive album), a 2018 metalcore album by Parkway Drive
 "Reverence" (song), a 1992 alternative rock song by The Jesus And Mary Chain

Other uses
 Reverence (sculpture), an outdoor sculpture in Vermont
 Reverence (horse), a British champion Thoroughbred racehorse

See also
 Revere (disambiguation)
 Reverend (disambiguation)
 Veneration, the act of honoring a saint, a person who has been identified as having a high degree of sanctity or holiness